Aamhi Saare Khavayye is an Indian Marathi-language cooking television show airing on Zee Marathi. It is the Zee Marathi's third longest-running soap opera in Marathi TV shows. Sankarshan Karhade and Prashant Damle are hosting the new season Jodit Godi. The show completed 3000 episodes on 5 November 2018.

Cast 
 Prashant Damle
 Sankarshan Karhade
 Devvrata Jategaonkar
 Mrunal Dusanis
 Rani Gunaji

Reception 
The show airing on Zee Marathi from Monday to Saturday by replacing Manasi Tumchya Ghari.

Special episode (1 hour) 
 23 July 2018
 13 September 2018
 18 September 2018
 10 October 2018
 18 October 2018

Airing history

Awards

References

External links 
 
 
 Aamhi Saare Khavayye at ZEE5

2007 Indian television series debuts
2022 Indian television series debuts
2020 Indian television series endings
Zee Marathi original programming
Marathi-language television shows